Illegalism is a tendency of anarchism that developed primarily in France, Italy, Belgium and Switzerland during the late 1890s and early 1900s as an outgrowth of individualist anarchism. Illegalists embrace criminality either openly or secretly as a lifestyle. Illegalism does not specify the type of crime, though it is associated with theft and shoplifting.

Some anarchists, like Clément Duval and Marius Jacob, justified theft with theories of individual reclamation (la reprise individuelle) and propaganda of the deed and saw their crime as an educational and organizational tool to facilitate a broader resistance movement. Others, such as Jules Bonnot and the Bonnot Gang, saw their actions in terms of egoist anarchism and referred to the philosophy of Max Stirner.

Influenced by theorist Max Stirner's egoism, some illegalists in France broke from anarchists. They argued that their actions required no moral basis and illegal acts were taken not in the name of a higher ideal, but in pursuit of one's own desires. In Paris, this milieu was centered on the weekly papers L'Anarchie and the Causeries Populaires (regular discussion groups meeting in several different locations in and around the capital each week), both of which were founded by Albert Libertad and his associates.

Theoretical premise 
Illegalism's premise is the rejection of law and the moral standards reflected by law. Illegalists contend that both written law and standards of morality perpetuate and reproduce capitalist thought, which they find oppressive and exploitative. The movement resists the order upheld by social institutions which emerge from this mode of production and its praxis thus reflects their vision for an individualist, yet cooperative, world beyond this order. Illegalism is distinct from many leftist ideologies and movements in its diversion from certain thought on morality and visions for economic organization. A number of them are also unique in their embrace of individualist thought, which is not widely reflected in the anarchist tendency towards collectivism. The revolutionary nature of the work did, however, necessitate a distinct social organization which promoted close communicative bonds between illegalists. Their expression through individualist practice was also complementary to more cooperative movements of resistance.

Its praxis largely involves direct intervention in economic affairs and seeks to subvert authoritarian, capitalist structures by reappropriating wealth through illegal acts such as theft, counterfeiting, swindling, and robbery. Many individualist anarchists already engaged in these practices out of necessity, since many of them were in positions of financial precarity. They attributed their financial status to the nature of capitalism, so these actions still had a distinct revolutionary component in these cases. Burglary, bombing, and assassination were included in illegalist tactics and they were seen as acts of "individual reappropriation" or "propaganda by the deed." These actions were simultaneously seen as manifestations of and direct resistance to a desperate condition and their practice was meant to motivate revolutionary action by others (at least by those who maintained these moral premises for their work).

Though both self-interest and political organizing played a role in the ideology of all illegalists, they were motivated by these respective factors to varying degrees. Participants viewed the movement differently, roughly along the lines of the distinction between those who ascribed to notions of "individual reappropriation" and "propaganda by the deed" and those who did not. Illegalists such as Clément Duval and Marius Jacob, who can be deemed proto-illegalists, aligned themselves with and were motivated by these ideological justifications. They committed crimes in hopes that they would be exemplary of revolutionary tactics and serve as educational tools in organizing a broader resistance movement. They saw their crime as influential in the way that it might subvert moral codes enforced by an unjust system and participated in illegalism in hopes of generating tangible structural change. In this way, they were not as closely affiliated with the individualist milieu than other illegalists.

Other illegalists, such as Jules Bonnot, were less concerned with the propagandist component of praxis, but rather saw the crime itself as the insurrection. They valued life in a state of rebellion to their society over the promotion of social revolution.

Clément Duval

Influenced by Max Stirner, Clément Duval was considered the first illegalist and helped construct the theoretical basis for anarchist criminal activity. He was a line soldier in the Franco-Prussian war, during which he suffered injuries that would debilitate him for a decade. He then joined the Panther of the Batignolles, a radical Parisian affinity group oriented towards violating laws and menacing law enforcement. Shortly after joining the group, he spent a year incarcerated for stealing 80 francs. In 1886, he broke into a socialites house to steal 15,000 francs and set the house on fire. His confession regarding the intentionality of the arson remains ambiguous. When apprehended by law enforcement two weeks later, he stabbed the officer repeatedly. He spoke to this action in an article in anarchist paper La Révole, maintaining that "theft exists only though the exploitation of man by man... when society refuses you the right to exist, you must take it... the police-man arrested me in the name of Law, I struck him in the name of Liberty." In 1901, he was sent to the Devil's Island penal colony, colloquially known as the "dry guillotine." He escaped after about 20 failed attempts and moved to New York City, never renouncing his criminality or anarchism.

Marius Jacob and the "Workers of the Night" 
Marius Jacob was another prominent illegalist in pre-war France. He engaged in only minor theft as a new anarchist. He was then imprisoned for six months at age 17 for being caught with explosives, as a result of being set up by an agent provocateur. Following his release, his professional opportunities were sabotaged by law enforcement officers who communicated with all of his employers and promoted his termination. With the help of a couple anarchist affiliates, Jacob then impersonated a senior police officer in a staged pawnshop raid in Marseilles in May 1899. He spent some time traveling around Europe and was arrested Toulon once he went back to France, to then be incarcerated in Aix-la-Provenec.

Like Duval, Jacob escaped prison. He was essentially unfazed by his imprisonment and returned to political resistance and illegal activity on a full-time basis. During the onset of the 20th century, he organized a group of anarchist illegalists who shared his experience of alienation from the world of traditional work. Named the "Workers of the Night," they dedicated their time to committing burglaries and dealing stolen goods. He was successful in his organization of a highly professional band of revolutionaries. They were centrally located in Paris but their practice was internationally expansive, operating throughout France, Italy, and Belgium. Individuals in the group assumed different roles which would work together cooperatively to effectively and efficiently carry out crime: the scouts, the burglars, and the fencers. This way, there were people responsible for observing and documenting potential sites for seamless crime, others who executed the robbery swiftly with the adequate tools at their disposal, and more who managed the resale of acquired goods, respectively.

This band's work was employed such that it was consistent with the ideological values of the illegalist movement. They sought to directly threaten the material wealth of members of the ruling class, who they saw as perpetrators of an unjust system. Victims included the wealthy, priests, and military officials, who the band considered "social parasites." Likewise, impoverished people and those who they deemed socially useful (e.g., doctors, architects, and writers) were never targeted. Members were armed, but murder was only condoned in the event of necessary self defense and they prioritized escape tactics to reduce the potential for such interpersonal conflict. Their avoidance of violent activity was distinct from the work of many illegalists and Jacob used the term "pacifistic illegalism" to distinguish them accordingly.

According to Jacob, he was involved in a total of 106 burglaries. He generously estimated that this amounted to 5 million francs worth of goods. Most of the members of the band were arrested towards the end of 1903, after two of them were caught in a trap set up for them in Paris. Jacob was sentenced to lifelong manual labor in the penal colonies, alongside his affiliate Bour, who killed the police officer who caught them in Abbeville. In January 1906, Jacob was moved to a facility in the lies du Saint, where he spent nearly 9 years in chains. His incarceration was limited to 20 years because his mother organized a campaign for his release. He spent the rest of his life as a traveling salesman and committed suicide by morphine overdose in August 1954. He claimed that his suicide was simply an attempt to dodge the elderly experience.

Bonnot Gang 

France's Bonnot Gang was the most famous group to embrace illegalism. The Bonnot Gang (La Bande à Bonnot) was a French criminal anarchist group that operated in France and Belgium during the Belle Époque from 1911 to 1912. Composed of individuals who identified with the emerging illegalist milieu, the gang utilized cutting-edge technology (including automobiles and repeating rifles) not yet available to the French police.

Octave Garnier and Jules Bonnot cofounded the Bonnot Gang. Originally referred to by the press as simply "The Auto Bandits," the gang was dubbed "The Bonnot Gang" after Jules Bonnot gave an interview at the office of Petit Parisien, a popular daily paper.

The group originated in Belgium, a location conducive to the congregation of political exiles and young men who wanted to escape obligation to serve in the French military. They fraternized over shared ideological values and began to organize in Brussels.

Garnier was incarcerated at the age of 17, yet found the world of work more alienating than that of crime or prison. During his time in the workforce, he was increasingly disillusioned to the practicality of radical economic change, dissatisfied even by the work of union leaders, who he considered as exploitative as the capitalists. In his biography, he identifies this period as the point at which he "became an anarchist. [He] was about 18 and no longer wanted to go back to work, so once again [he] began la reprise individuelle." He was among those who found refuge from compulsory French military service in Belgium. This is where he encountered the editor of Le Révolte, a prominent anarchist paper in Brussels which upheld anarchist, individualist thought and activity.

Literature such as this served as a catalyst for the expansion of illegalist thought. Another paper, l'Anarchie, included an article by Victor Kibalchich, which expressed the following sentiment: "In the ordinary sense of the word we cannot and will not be honest. By definition, the anarchist lives by expediency; work for him, is a deplorable expedient, like stealing... He takes no account of any conventions which safeguard property; for him, force alone counts. Thus we have neither to approve nor disapprove of illegal actions. We say: they are logical. The anarchist is always illegal - theoretically. The sole word 'anarchist' means rebellion in every sense." The paper was eventually controlled entirely by illegalists, with Kibalchich assuming a role as editor. This production of illegalist thought was opportune for the education and organizing behind the formation of the Bonnot Gang.

Jules Bonnot differed from the other members of his gang in the sense that he did serve in the military. He used the experience as an opportunity to refine technical skills which would help him in his life of crime. He was also roughly 10 years older than the rest of the group, which was advantageous in that it gave him a distinct confidence and infectious measured recklessness. His first significant robbery was in July 1910, when he stole 36,000 francs from the home of a wealthy lawyer in Vienne. Garnier was on a panel of illegalists which gathered to hear Bonnot's account of a supposed homicide and recognized Bonnot as the right candidate to form an illegalist action group with.

The Bonnot Gang committed its first robbery at a bank in Paris in December 1911, during which they shot a collection clerk, stole over 5,000 francs, and escaped in a stolen vehicle. They broke into a gun store a week later. A few days after this, in January 1912, they stole 30,000 francs from the home of M. Moreau and murdered him, along with his maid. They quickly became a target for law enforcement and did not hesitate to kill police officers who pursued them. They continued with patterns of robbery throughout the next couple of months, losing some members to arrest along the way. Garnier and Bonnet were among members who persisted in their resistance throughout this time. The prominence of both figures within the group was later reinforced by their high-profile deaths during separate shootouts with French police. In February of 1913, remaining members were tried and received their respective sentences to imprisonment and death.

Suppression 
Since their praxis was quite literally a resistance to legal order, it was almost inevitable that it would be suppressed by law enforcement. While some illegalists were able to spare themselves through arrangements with police officers that were sacrificial to others in the movement, hundreds of them were imprisoned long term. Draconian French laws of the time meant that prisoners such as Clément Duval (for the time that he was there) suffered conditions in penal colonies comparable to those of death camps.

Unlike Duval, who remained staunch in his politics after escaping from prison, incarceration motivated a number of illegalists to neglect the cause. They were effectively suppressed to the extent where their actions were mercenary and contradictory to the premise of their former ideology. In this way, the movement was directly silenced by state force and transformed into an economic cycle in which repression and "crime" were perpetuated.

For example, following his arrest for harboring members of the Bonnot Gang, Victor Serge, once a forceful defender of illegalism, became a sharp critic. In Memoirs of a Revolutionary, he describes illegalism as "a collective suicide".

Similarly, Marius Jacob reflected in 1948: "I don't think that illegalism can free the individual in present-day society. If he manages to free himself of a few constraints using this means, the unequal nature of the struggle will create others that are even worse and, in the end, will lead to the loss of his freedom, the little freedom he had, and sometimes his life. Basically, illegalism, considered as an act of revolt, is more a matter of temperament than of doctrine. This is why it cannot have an educational effect on the working masses as a whole. By this, I mean a worthwhile educational effect." Ultimately, experience with and attitudes towards imprisonment worked to reconstruct some illegalists' perception of their practice. The legal consequences of their actions prompted a sense that their work was not worthwhile, as attempts towards self liberation and political influence involved the risk of being denied all freedom and capacity to organize meaningfully. This speaks to the efficacy of the state's use of force to suppress the political movement.

See also 
 Alfredo M. Bonanno
 Amoralism
 Expropriative anarchism
 Insurrectionary anarchism
 Piracy
 Social bandits
 Value theory
 Wrongdoing

References

Bibliography

Further reading 
 
 

 
Anarchist schools of thought
Individualist anarchism
Anarchist movements
Crime
Anarchism in France